The National Collegiate Athletic Association is composed of athletic teams of more than a thousand member colleges and universities.

A

B

C

D 

 Daemen University
 Dallas Baptist University
 Dartmouth College
 Davenport University
 Davidson College
 Davis & Elkins College
 Dean College
 Defiance College
 Delaware State University
 Delaware Valley University
 Delta State University
 Denison University
 DePaul University
 DePauw University
 DeSales University
 Dickinson College
 Dominican University (in Illinois)
 Dominican University (in New York)
 Dominican University of California
 Drake University
 Drew University
 Drexel University
 Drury University
 Duke University
 Duquesne University of the Holy Spirit
 D'Youville University

E 

 Earlham College
 East Carolina University
 East Central University
 East Stroudsburg University of Pennsylvania
 East Tennessee State University
 East Texas Baptist University
 Eastern Connecticut State University
 Eastern Illinois University
 Eastern Kentucky University
 Eastern Mennonite University
 Eastern Michigan University
 Eastern Nazarene College
 Eastern New Mexico University
 Eastern University
 Eastern Washington University
 Eckerd College
 Edgewood College
 Edward Waters University
 Elizabeth City State University
 Elizabethtown College
 Elmhurst University
 Elmira College
 Elon University
 Embry–Riddle Aeronautical University
 Emerson College
 Emmanuel College (in Georgia)
 Emmanuel College (in Massachusetts)
 Emory University
 Emory & Henry College
 Emporia State University
 Endicott College
 Erskine College
 Eureka College

F 

 Fairfield University
 Fairleigh Dickinson University
 Fairleigh Dickinson University, Florham
 Fairmont State University
 Farmingdale State College
 Fayetteville State University
 Felician University
 Ferris State University
 Ferrum College
 Finlandia University
 Fitchburg State University
 Flagler College
 Florida Agricultural and Mechanical University
 Florida Atlantic University
 Florida Gulf Coast University
 Florida Institute of Technology
 Florida International University
 Florida Southern College
 Florida State University
 Fontbonne University
 Fordham University
 Fort Hays State University
 Fort Lewis College
 Fort Valley State University
 Framingham State University
 Francis Marion University
 Franciscan University of Steubenville
 Franklin College
 Franklin Pierce University
 Franklin & Marshall College
 Fresno Pacific University
 Frostburg State University
 Furman University

G 

 Gallaudet University
 Gannon University
 Gardner–Webb University
 Geneva College
 George Fox University
 George Mason University
 The George Washington University
 Georgetown University
 Georgia College & State University
 Georgia Institute of Technology
 Georgia Southern University
 Georgia Southwestern State University
 Georgia State University
 Georgian Court University
 Gettysburg College
 Glenville State University
 Goldey–Beacom College
 Gonzaga University
 Gordon College
 Goucher College
 Grambling State University
 Grand Canyon University
 Grand Valley State University
 Greensboro College
 Greenville University
 Grinnell College
 Grove City College
 Guilford College
 Gustavus Adolphus College
 Gwynedd Mercy University

H 

 Hamilton College
 Hamline University
 Hampden–Sydney College
 Hampton University
 Hanover College
 Harding University
 Hardin–Simmons University
 Hartwick College
 Harvard University
 Harvey Mudd College
 Haverford College
 Hawaiʻi Pacific University
 Heidelberg University
 Henderson State University
 Hendrix College
 High Point University
 Hilbert College
 Hillsdale College
 Hiram College
 Hobart College
 Hofstra University
 Hollins University
 Holy Family University
 Holy Names University
 Hood College
 Hope College
 Houghton University
 Houston Baptist University
 Howard Payne University
 Howard University
 Hunter College
 Huntington University
 Husson University

I 

 Idaho State University
 Illinois College
 Illinois Institute of Technology
 Illinois State University
 Illinois Wesleyan University
 Immaculata University
 Indiana State University
 Indiana University Bloomington
 Indiana University of Pennsylvania
 Indiana University–Purdue University Indianapolis – To be dissolved in 2024 and replaced by separate institutions affiliated with Indiana University and Purdue University. The athletic program and its NCAA membership will transfer to the IU-affiliated institution.
 Iona University
 Iowa State University of Science and Technology
 Ithaca College

J 

 Jackson State University
 Jacksonville State University
 Jacksonville University
 James Madison University
 John Carroll University
 John Jay College of Criminal Justice
 Johns Hopkins University
 Johnson C. Smith University
 Johnson & Wales University
 Johnson & Wales University Charlotte
 Juniata College

K 

 Kalamazoo College
 Kansas State University of Agriculture and Applied Science
 Kean University
 Keene State College
 Kennesaw State University
 Kent State University
 Kentucky State University
 Kentucky Wesleyan College
 Kenyon College
 Keuka College
 Keystone College
 King University
 Knox College
 Kutztown University of Pennsylvania

L

M

N

O 

 Oakland University
 Oberlin College
 Occidental College
 Oglethorpe University
 Ohio Dominican University
 Ohio Northern University
 The Ohio State University
 The Ohio University
 Ohio Wesleyan University
 Oklahoma Baptist University
 Oklahoma Christian University
 Oklahoma State University–Stillwater
 Old Dominion University
 Olivet College
 Oral Roberts University
 Oregon State University
 Otterbein University
 Ouachita Baptist University

P 

 Pace University
 Pacific Lutheran University
 Pacific University
 Palm Beach Atlantic University
 Pennsylvania College of Technology
 The Pennsylvania State University
 Pennsylvania State University Abington
 Pennsylvania State University Altoona
 Pennsylvania State University Berks
 Pennsylvania State University Erie, The Behrend College
 Pennsylvania State University Harrisburg, The Capital College
 Pennsylvania Western University California
 Pennsylvania Western University Clarion
 Pennsylvania Western University Edinboro
 Pepperdine University
 Pfeiffer University
 Piedmont University
 Pittsburg State University
 Pitzer College
 Plymouth State University
 Point Loma Nazarene University
 Pomona College
 Portland State University
 Post University
 Prairie View A&M University
 Pratt Institute
 Presbyterian College
 Princeton University
 Principia College
 Providence College
 Purdue University
 Purdue University Fort Wayne
 Purdue University Northwest

Q 

 Queens College, City University of New York
 Queens University of Charlotte (in North Carolina)
 Quincy University
 Quinnipiac University

R 

 Radford University
 Ramapo College
 Randolph College
 Randolph–Macon College
 Regis College
 Regis University
 Rensselaer Polytechnic Institute
 Rhode Island College
 Rhodes College
 Rider University
 Ripon College
 Rivier University
 Roanoke College
 Robert Morris University
 Roberts Wesleyan University
 Rochester Institute of Technology
 Rockford University
 Rockhurst University
 Roger Williams University
 Rogers State University
 Rollins College
 Rosemont College
 Rose–Hulman Institute of Technology
 Rowan University
 Russell Sage College
 Rutgers, The State University of New Jersey–Camden
 Rutgers, The State University of New Jersey–New Brunswick
 Rutgers, The State University of New Jersey–Newark

S

T

U

V 

 Valdosta State University
 Valparaiso University
 Vanderbilt University
 Vassar College
 Villanova University
 Virginia Commonwealth University
 Virginia Military Institute
 Virginia Polytechnic Institute and State University
 Virginia State University
 Virginia Union University
 Virginia Wesleyan University

W

X 

 Xavier University

Y 

 Yale University
 Yeshiva University
 York College of Pennsylvania
 York College, City University of New York
 Young Harris College
 Youngstown State University

Z 
No NCAA institutions begin with the letter Z.

See also 

 List of NCAA Division I institutions
 List of NCAA Division II institutions
 List of NCAA Division III institutions

References 
NCAA Member Directory

Lists of universities and colleges in the United States
NCAA lists